The following teams and players took part in the men's volleyball tournament at the 1988 Summer Olympics, in Seoul.

Argentina
The following volleyball players represented Argentina:
 Claudio Zulianello
 Daniel Castellani
 Eduardo Martínez
 Alejandro Diz
 Daniel Colla
 Carlos Weber
 Hugo Conte
 Waldo Kantor
 Raúl Quiroga
 Jon Emili Uriarte
 José De Palma
 Juan Carlos Cuminetti

Brazil
The following volleyball players represented Brazil:
 Amauri
 Pampa
 Carlão
 Domingos Maracanã
 Montanaro
 Leonídio de Pra
 Maurício
 Paulão
 Wagner Rocha
 Paulo Roese
 Renan
 William

Bulgaria
The following volleyball players represented Bulgaria:
 Borislav Kyosev
 Dimo Tonev
 Ilian Kaziyski
 Konstantin Mitev
 Lyubomir Ganev
 Milcho Milanov
 Nayden Naydenov
 Petko Petkov
 Petko Dragiev
 Plamen Khristov
 Sava Kovachev
 Tsvetan Florov

France
The following volleyball players represented France:
 Philippe Blain
 Jean-Baptiste Martzluff
 Hervé Mazzon
 Éric N'Gapeth
 Éric Bouvier
 Christophe Meneau
 Jean-Marc Jurkovitz
 Laurent Tillie
 Olivier Rossard
 Patrick Duflos
 Alain Fabiani
 Philippe-Marie Salvan

Italy
The following volleyball players represented Italy:
 Alessandro Lazzeroni
 Andrea Gardini
 Andrea Giani
 Andrea Zorzi
 Claudio Galli
 Ferdinando De Giorgi
 Lorenzo Bernardi
 Luca Cantagalli
 Marco Bracci
 Massimo Castagna
 Pier Paolo Lucchetta
 Andrea Lucchetta

Japan
The following volleyball players represented Japan:
 Akihiro Iwashima
 Eizaburo Mitsuhashi
 Hideharu Hara
 Hiromichi Kageyama
 Kazutomo Yoneyama
 Kimio Sugimoto
 Masaki Kaito
 Masayoshi Manabe
 Shunichi Kawai
 Yasunori Kumada
 Yuji Kasama
 Yuzuru Inoue

Netherlands
The following volleyball players represented the Netherlands:
 Martin Teffer
 Pieter Jan Leeuwerink
 Ron Boudrie
 Jan Posthuma
 Ronald Zoodsma
 Ron Zwerver
 Avital Selinger
 Edwin Benne
 Teun Buijs
 Peter Blangé
 Marco Brouwers
 Rob Grabert

South Korea
The following volleyball players represented South Korea:
 Jang Yun-chang
 Choi Cheon-sik
 Han Jang-seok
 Jeong Ui-tak
 Kim Sa-seok
 Kim Ho-cheol
 Lee Chae-on
 Lee Jong-kyung
 Lee Myeong-hak
 Lee Sang-yeol
 Lee Seong-hui
 Park Sam-ryong

Soviet Union
The following volleyball players represented the Soviet Union:
 Yuriy Panchenko
 Andrey Kuznetsov
 Vyacheslav Zaytsev
 Igor Runov
 Vladimir Shkurikhin
 Yevgeny Krasilnikov
 Raimonds Vilde
 Valery Losev
 Yury Sapega
 Oleksandr Sorokalet
 Yaroslav Antonov
 Yury Cherednik

Sweden
The following volleyball players represented Sweden:
 Håkan Björne
 Bengt Gustafson
 Jan Hedengård
 Tomas Hoszek
 Patrik Johansson
 Jannis Kalmazidis
 Mats Karlsson
 Urban Lennartsson
 Anders Lundmark
 Lars Nilsson
 Per-Anders Sääf
 Peter Tholse

Tunisia
The following volleyball players represented Tunisia:
 Abdel Aziz Ben Abdallah
 Abderrazak Ben Massaoud
 Faycal Ben Amara
 Hichem Ben Amira
 Fethi Ghariani
 Hedi Bousarsar
 Lotfi Ben Slimane
 Mohamed Sarsar
 Mourad Tebourski
 Msaddak Lahmar
 Rashid Bousarsar
 Raouf Chenoufi

United States
The following volleyball players represented the United States:
 Troy Tanner
 Dave Saunders
 Jon Root
 Bob Ctvrtlik
 Doug Partie
 Steve Timmons
 Craig Buck
 Scott Fortune
 Ricci Luyties
 Jeff Stork
 Eric Sato
 Karch Kiraly

References

1988